Shanyin County is a county in the northwest of Shanxi province, China. It is under the administration of Shuozhou City.

The Guangwu section of the Great Wall runs along the county. Near the section of the Great Wall are the historic villages of New Guangwu and Old Guangwu.

Climate

References

External links
www.xzqh.org 

County-level divisions of Shanxi
Shuozhou